Statistics of Liberian Premier League in season 1999.

Overview
It was contested by 9 teams, and Invincible Eleven won the championship.

References
Liberia – List of final tables (RSSSF)

Football competitions in Liberia
Lea